Breda Academy is a controlled secondary school in Belfast, Northern Ireland, which opened in September 2015.

History 
Breda Academy opened in 2015 as an amalgamation between Newtownbreda High School and Knockbreda High School.

Enrollment 
The school currently has just under 700 students enrolled at the school, with 150 enrolled within the schools Sixth Form.

In September 2022, the school enrolled 130 new year 8 students.

Academics 
The school offers both GCSE and A Level courses for study.

The school states that, in 2022, 98% of year 12 students achieved 5 or more GCSEs at grades A*-C (62% including English and Maths) and 70% of year 14 students achieved 3 A Levels at grades A*-C.

References 

Secondary schools in Belfast